The Stone Idol is the 65th title of the Hardy Boys Mystery Stories, written by Franklin W. Dixon. Wanderer Books published the book in 1981 and Grosset & Dunlap published the book in 2005.

Plot summary
When an ancient stone idol disappears, the Hardy Boys are off on another fast-paced adventure. It's a mystery that takes the boys from a primitive village in the Andes Mountains to Antarctica and finally to Easter Island. By using their fine investigative skills, the Hardy Boys find that the mystery of the stone idol is not what it seems.

The Hardy Boys books
1981 American novels
1981 children's books